In algebra, the term Hermite ring (after Charles Hermite) has been applied to three different objects.

(The term left Hermite is defined similarly.) Matrices over such a ring can be put in Hermite normal form by right multiplication by a square invertible matrix (p. 468.) (appendix to §I.4) calls this property K-Hermite, using Hermite instead in the sense given below.

This is equivalent to requiring that any row vector (b1,...,bn) of elements of the ring which generate it as a right module (i.e., b1R+...+bnR=R) can be completed to a (not necessarily square) invertible matrix by adding some number of rows. (The criterion of being left Hermite can be defined similarly.) (p. 528) earlier called a commutative ring with this property an H-ring.

All commutative rings which are Hermite in the sense of Kaplansky are also Hermite in the sense of Lam, but the converse is not necessarily true.  All Bézout domains are Hermite in the sense of Kaplansky, and a commutative ring which is Hermite in the sense of Kaplansky is also a Bézout ring (pp. 39-40.)

References

Ring theory